Albert William Barling (24 January 1878 – 2 December 1952) was an Australian rules footballer who played for the Geelong Football Club in the Victorian Football League (VFL).

Notes

External links 

1878 births
1952 deaths
Australian rules footballers from Victoria (Australia)
Geelong Football Club players
Chilwell Football Club players